The Oijen Ferry is a cable ferry across the river Meuse in the Netherlands. The ferry crosses from the village of Oijen in North Brabant, to a point near Alphen in Gelderland.

References 

Ferries of the Netherlands
Cable ferries